Square Lake is a lake in Washington County, in the U.S. state of Minnesota.

Square Lake was so named on account of its boxy outline.

See also
List of lakes in Minnesota

References

Lakes of Minnesota
Lakes of Washington County, Minnesota